The 1892 Nebraska Bugeaters football team represented the University of Nebraska in the 1892 college football season. The team had no  head coach, though Omaha lawyer J. S. Williams led the team for one game, and played home games at Lincoln Park, in Lincoln, Nebraska. They competed as members of the Western Interstate University Football Association.

This was Nebraska's first season as a member of an athletic conference, joining Iowa, Kansas, and Missouri in the newly formed WIUFA.

Nebraska played without a permanent head coach for the third straight season, upsetting many program supporters. The university's newspaper opined "We are thoroughly disgusted with the cheap-John plan of amateur coaches".  By the beginning of the 1893 season, Nebraska hired its first paid football coach.

Schedule

Coaching staff

Roster

Starters

Game summaries

Illinois

George Flippin, Nebraska's first black player and only the fifth black athlete at a predominantly white college, recovered a late fumble and later scored the game's only points to give the Bugeaters a 6–0 win.

Historical sources disagree on who coached Nebraska in this game. Some suggest J. S. Williams coached this game and quit after, while others show a different coach recorded only as "Mr. Baldwin" was expected to coach against Illinois but ultimately did not, and therefore Williams arrived sometime after this game.

This was the first game in which Nebraska appeared in scarlet and cream, which would later become the university's official colors.

at Denver Athletic Club

Although Nebraska faced an out-of-state team for the first time in 1891, this was NU's first game played outside the state of Nebraska. The Bugeaters were badly outmatched by the professional-grade Denver Athletic Club, managing only a late touchdown to avoid a shutout loss.

Missouri

This was set to be Nebraska's first-ever conference game, but the University of Missouri squad refused to play due to the presence of African American George Flippin on NU's roster. The game was ruled a forfeit and the score officially recorded as 1–0. Afterward, the WIUFA established a rule preventing member teams from refusing to play scheduled matches.

Official University of Missouri records list the score of this game as a 6–0 forfeit Nebraska victory.

Kansas

Despite being only the second conference game for both teams, the WIUFA's brief conference slate made this the de facto conference championship game. The Bugeaters escaped early Jayhawks scoring opportunities, but were unable to do anything on offense as Kansas eventually wore Nebraska down to claim the first WIUFA football title.

This was the first of what would become the longest continuous annual series between any two college football teams, as Kansas and Nebraska would meet every year from 1891 through 2010. The annual series ended in 2011 when Nebraska joined the Big Ten Conference.

Iowa

Halfback George Flippin opened the game with a 40-yard run around the right end, which was followed by a Bugeater touchdown. Iowa responded with two touchdowns before halftime to pull ahead 10–4. Flippin scored to open the second half, and a successful extra kick tied the game at 10, when it was called on account of darkness, becoming the first tie in Nebraska history.

References

Nebraska
Nebraska Cornhuskers football seasons
Nebraska Bugeaters football